"Wild Frontier" is the twenty-third single released by the British electronic band The Prodigy. It was released on 23 February 2015, for their album The Day Is My Enemy. The cover art was designed by Austrian artist and designer Moritz Resl.

The remix EP was released on 16 March.

Track listing

Official versions
"Wild Frontier" (Instrumental) (4:30)

Music video
The official music video was posted on the band's YouTube page on 23 February 2015. The video, a stop-motion animation was directed by the Dutch filmmaker Mascha Halberstad and animator Elmer Kaan, features two hunters hunting animals. They later get turned into two animals themselves after a moose that arrives to save the animals puts them into a trance-like state. It also features the fox that was present in the video for the band's earlier single, Nasty.

References

The Prodigy songs
2015 singles
Songs written by Liam Howlett
2015 songs
Cooking Vinyl singles
Animated music videos